Ahmad Sulaiman Ibrahim popularly known as Alaramma Ahmad Sulaiman, was born in 1966, he is a Nigerian Reciter, Islamic scholar, cleric, and the famous Qur'anic reciter he also received many awards worldwide for his excellence in reciting the Qur'an.

Early life
Ahmad Sulaiman was born in the Family of Sulaiman, his father died since he was at 6 years old, and he moved to Kano state when he was at 9 years old for Islamic school and western education, Ahmad Sulaiman have memorized the Qur'an at an early age of his life he also said Dr Kabir Haruna Gombe is among of his teachers and he is Alaramma to him during Ramadan Tafsir, Ahmad Sulaiman is a member of Jama'atu Izalatil Bid'ah wa Iqamatus Sunnah, the largest Salafiyyah movement in Nigeria.

Abduction of Ahmad Sulaiman
In March 2019, Sheikh Ahmad Sulaiman was abducted by some kidnapers on his way from his home town to Kano after his visit to Kebbi state, Sheikh Ahmad Sulaiman has been reportedly kidnapped by unknown gunmen in Katsina State, multiple sources, have confirmed that Sheikh Sulaiman was abducted together with five others along Sheme to Ƙanƙara local government areas of Katsina State. Sheikh has been released after 15 days from his captivity.

Commissioner of Education
Ahmad Sulaiman was appointed as a commissioner of education in Kano state by Dr Abdullahi Umar Ganduje the present Kano state governor.

References

Living people
Nigerian Sunni Muslims
Nigerian Sunni religious leaders
1966 births